Bel Ombre may refer to:

Bel Ombre, Mauritius, a village in the district of Savanne, Mauritius
Bel Ombre, Seychelles, an administrative district of Seychelles